Schistophleps lofaushanensis is a moth in the subfamily Arctiinae. It was described by Franz Daniel in 1951. It is found in southern China.

References

Moths described in 1951
Nudariina